The Women's Arab Clubs Champions Championship is a sport competition for club volleyball teams, currently held annually and organized by the Arab Volleyball Association. the first edition was played in Tunisia in 1998.

See also 

 Arab Clubs Championship (volleyball)

References

International volleyball competitions
Volleyball in the Arab world
Multi-national professional sports leagues